Edward J. Zeman (June 8, 1905 – May 21, 1966) was an American politician.

Zeman was born in Chicago, Illinois. He worked for Livestock Press and for the city of Chicago. Zeman served in the Illinois House of Representatives in 1945 and 1946 and in the Illinois Senate from 1947 until 1951. He was a Democrat. Zeman died suddenly at his summer home in Linn, Wisconsin, Walworth County, Wisconsin.

Notes

External links

1905 births
1966 deaths
Politicians from Chicago
Democratic Party members of the Illinois House of Representatives
Democratic Party Illinois state senators
20th-century American politicians